The Women's Challenge bicycle race (originally known as the Ore-Ida Women's Challenge as the lead sponsor was the Ore-Ida brand of frozen potato products) was held annually in the western United States in southern Idaho, beginning in 1984 until its demise in 2002. Later primary sponsors were PowerBar and Hewlett-Packard.

During much of its 19-year history, it was the most prestigious women's cycle race in North America. From 1995, when it first obtained sanctioning from the Union Cycliste Internationale (UCI), the international governing body for cycling, it developed into one of the strongest races in the world, attracting numerous World and Olympic Champions. Prior to that, in 1990, the UCI had refused to sanction the event, citing as their reason the "excessive climbing, stage distances, number of stages, and duration of event."

The following year (1991) marked the debut on the international scene of a team representing Lithuania, which had just recently declared its independence and was still awaiting recognition as a country. Professionals were allowed to compete beginning in 1993.

The race, which was run almost entirely by volunteers, set a very high standard in terms of technical administration and conduct of the race itself. Jim Rabdau, the race founder, served as chief organizer of the race throughout its entire history.

By the late 1990s, the race was able to attract sufficient sponsorship money to offer the richest prize fund ever in women's cycling and, for a while, was the richest prize fund race in North America, men's or women's. At its peak, it offered $125,000 in prizes.

However, cuts in sponsorship forced a reduction in prize money to $75,000 in its last year (2002) and no title sponsor could be found to replace the outgoing sponsor for the following year, forcing the cancellation of the race. Race organizers cited a downturn in the economy as the reason.

Women's Challenge winners

References

External links
Official Site of event (contains info on why event ended)
Cycling News article on 2002 event

Women's road bicycle races
Cycle races in the United States
Recurring sporting events established in 1984
1984 establishments in Idaho
2002 disestablishments in Idaho
Women's sports in Idaho